Idiosepius pygmaeus, also known as the two-toned pygmy squid, Tropical Pygmy squid, is a species of bobtail squid native to the Indo-Pacific. It occurs in waters of the South China Sea, Japan, Philippines, Palau, Indonesia, Northern Mariana Islands, as well as northern and northeastern Australia. It inhabits shallow, inshore waters.

I. pygmaeus weighs 0.00033 g upon hatching and increases in weight to 0.175 g as it reaches maturity in 50 days (1260 degree days). It inhabits waters at a temperature of 25.2 °C. Growth rate has been calculated as 12.55 and physiological growth rate as 0.498.

I. pygmaeus grows to 20 mm in mantle length.

This species has been reared on a diet of glass shrimp (Acetes sibogae australis) in the laboratory.

The type specimen was collected in the South China Sea and is deposited at the Zoologisk Museum of Kobenhavns Universitet in Copenhagen.

References

Further reading
Jackson, G.D. 1989. The use of statolith microstructures to analyze life-history events in the small tropical cephalopod Idiosepius pygmaeus. Fishery Bulletin 87: 265-272.
Jackson, G.D. 1992. Seasonal variation in reproductive investment in the tropical Loliginid squid Loligo chinensis and the small tropical Sepioid Idiosepius pygmaeus. Fishery Bulletin 91: 260-270.
Jackson, G.D. 1992. Seasonal abundance of the small tropical Sepioid Idiosepius pygmaeus (Cephalopoda: Idiosepiidae) at two localities off Townsville, north Queensland Australia. The Veliger 35(4): 396-401.
Moynihan, M. 1983. Notes on the behavior of Idiosepius pygmaeus (Cephalopoda; Idiosepiidae). Behaviour 85: 42-57.
Sasaki, M. 1923. On an adhering habit of a pygmy cuttlefish, Idiosepius pygmaeus Steenstrup. Annotationes Zoolodicae Japanenses 10(21): 209-213.

External links

Latitude and Longitude Data for Idiosepius pygmaeus 
GenBank Links for Genetic Information on Idiosepius pygmaeus
 

Bobtail squid
Cephalopods described in 1881